North Carolina Highway 200 (NC 200) is a primary state highway in the U.S. state of North Carolina. The highway runs north–south from the South Carolina state line near the community of JAARS, to US 601 near Concord.

Route description

NC 200 traverses , starting at the South Carolina state line, through the city of Monroe, and the towns of Stanfield and Locust, before ending at US 601 near Concord. For its length, it is a two-lane rural highway except in Monroe where it is a four-lane road from Charlotte Avenue to US 74 and a six-lane divided highway on its concurrency with US 74 and US 601.

History
Established in 1930, it traveled from Monroe at US 74/NC 20/NC 25/NC 151 south to the South Carolina state line where it changed into SC 93 (renumbered to SC 200 in 1937). Between 1931-36, NC 200 was realigned north of Old Highway Road near Jackson. In 1936, the highway was extended north via Franklin Street, Church Street, Winchester Street, and finally Morgan Mill Road to NC 27 in Locust. In 1942, the highway was extended again north to current terminus at NC 151 (renumbered to US 601 in 1951).

About 1958, NC 200 was rerouted in Monroe to follow Morrow Road and Haynes Street onto new bypass US 74/US 601, then return on Morgan Mill Road. By 1982, it had reverted to follow along Charlotte Avenue and Church Street.

NC 200 was rerouted northwest on a new road around downtown Monroe in August 2011 utilizing Martin Luther King Boulevard and Dickerson Boulevard to connect with US 74. The old alignment, Lancaster Avenue and Charlotte Avenue to Franklin Street, was downgraded to a secondary road. NC 75 was extended, replacing NC 200 from Franklin Street to Haynes Street, via Charlotte Avenue and Church Street. NC 207 was also extended, replacing NC 200 from Church Street to US 74/US 601 (Roosevelt Boulevard), along Haynes Street/Skyway Drive.

Junction list

See also
North Carolina Bicycle Route 6-Concurrent with NC 200 from Reed Mine Road to Mount Pleasant Road near Georgeville

References

External links

NCRoads.com: N.C. 200

200
Transportation in Union County, North Carolina
Transportation in Stanly County, North Carolina
Transportation in Cabarrus County, North Carolina